The Detroit Compuware Ambassadors were an elite Midget Major ice hockey team playing in the Tier I Elite Hockey League. The Ambassadors previously had separate franchises that competed in the North American Hockey League and in the Ontario Hockey League for two seasons from 1990 to 1992. The Compuware Ambassadors were based in Detroit, Michigan.

History
The Detroit Compuware Hockey organization was founded in the mid 1970s by Compuware owner/president Peter Karmanos and his partner Thomas Thewes. The organization grew to include all age levels of hockey including Junior 'A'. The Junior 'A 'team competed in the North American Hockey League. Some of its alumni include Eric Lindros, Pat LaFontaine, Mike Modano, Al Iafrate, David Legwand, Derian Hatcher and Doug Weight. The program was so successful that its owners endeavored to expand the Compuware Ambassador program to play at a higher level.

Karmanos had previous experience in the OHL, owning the Windsor Spitfires team during the 1980s that won the J. Ross Robertson Cup in 1988. Karmanos sold the Spitfires in 1989 after a failed attempt to relocate the team across the river. Karmanos also failed in his bid to buy out and relocate the Sault Ste. Marie Greyhounds. Failing which, Karmanos chose the route of an expansion team. The Detroit Compuware Ambassadors were granted as an expansion franchise in the Ontario Hockey League on December 11, 1989. Detroit became the first American-based team in the league. Andy Weidenbach was named the team's first coach. Following Karmanos to Detroit from the Windsor Compuware Spitfires would be team president Jim Rutherford and general manager Tony McDonald.

First season
Detroit lost its first seven games before posting its first victory, 7-3 over the Owen Sound Platers at Cobo Arena October 4, 1990. After a 3-game win streak, the Ambassadors would drop 11 straight games. Despite the losing, there were some bright lights. First overall draft pick Pat Peake with 39 goals & 51 assists was the team's offensive leader, figuring in over 40 percent of the team's goals.

Despite finishing last overall in the OHL their first season, the Ambassadors executives stuck to the same plan that help bring success to the Spitfires. The Ambassadors earned the reputation as a physical team. Six different players would amass over 100 penalty minutes, including captain Paul Mitton (152 minutes).

Second season
Detroit used its first overall draft pick in 1991 to select Todd Harvey. The Ambassadors also selected Ryan Sittler (2nd round) and Anson Carter (14th) in the same draft, but both elected to play collegiate hockey.

After dropping five in a row to start the season, Detroit won 7 of its next 9 games to enter November winning half their games. Although the Ambassadors were much improved, Rutherford decided to make a coaching change November 30 after a 7-5 loss in Niagara Falls. Coach Andy Weidenbach was let go. Detroit stood 11-16-0 at the time. Jim Rutherford moved behind the bench to coach the rest of the season. Rutherford played 13 seasons in the NHL as a goalie, spending most of his time with the Detroit Red Wings.

Detroit finished with a record of 23-42-1. Pat Peake led the team in scoring again with 41 goals and 52 assists. Detroit made the last playoff spot in the Emms division finishing 7th place. Detroit bussed to Niagara Falls to start their first-ever playoff series against the second place Thunder. The Ambassadors nearly pulled off a major upset, taking a three-games-to-one lead in the series after a 5-3 victory over Niagara Falls March 19. But the Thunder came back to win the final three games of the series, including game seven in Niagara Falls, 7-2.

After their second season was completed, the Compuware Ambassadors were renamed Detroit Junior Red Wings.

NHL alumni
Seven players from the Compuware Ambassadors OHL team went on to NHL careers.

Pat Peake was the first draft pick in the history of the Compuware Ambassadors franchise, and his #14 was retired by the Whalers organization. Peake was chosen 14th overall in the 1st round of the 1991 NHL Entry Draft by the Washington Capitals.

Eric Cairns
Todd Harvey
Mark Lawrence
Pat Peake
Keith Redmond
Derek Wilkinson
Bob Wren

Yearly results
Regular season

Playoffs
1990–91 - Out of playoffs.
1991–92 - Lost to Niagara Falls Thunder 4 games to 3 in first round.

Uniforms and logos

The Compuware Ambassadors colours were brown, orange & white. The home jerseys had a white background with brown & orange trim. The road jerseys were an orange background with white & brown trim.

The logo displays the silhouette of the Ambassador Bridge against the backdrop of downtown Detroit, surrounded by the words compuware in a circle, and the Ambassadors in front.

Arenas
For the 1990–91 season, the Ambassadors played home games at Cobo Arena. During the summer of 1991, Olympia Arenas Inc. decided maintaining ice surfaces at both Cobo Arena and Joe Louis Arena was too costly, so the plug was pulled on Cobo Arena.

During the Ambassadors' one season at Cobo, maintenance crews would shuttle zambonis between Cobo Arena and Joe Louis Arena by driving them along the riverfront down Atwater Street.

For the 1991–92 season, the Ambassadors played home games at Joe Louis Arena, the same home arena as the Detroit Red Wings of the NHL.

Cobo Arena The OHL Arena & Travel Guide
Joe Louis Arena The OHL Arena & Travel Guide

External links
 Compuware Ambassadors web site
 Complete franchise history

1990 establishments in Michigan
Defunct Ontario Hockey League teams
C
Ice hockey clubs established in 1990
1992 disestablishments in Michigan
Sports clubs disestablished in 1992